Jürgen Van der Velde is a Belgian football adviser and former professional football player who played as a goalkeeper.

Club career
Jurgen played professionally for R.W.D. Molenbeek in Belgium from 1995 til 1999. His professional career was cut short by a severe injury, but he continued to play in Belgian amateur divisions until the age of 37.

International career
He got several caps for the Belgium national under-21 football team. He also played for his country's B-squad.

Professional life
Van der Velde learned the Chinese Mandarin language and worked as an entrepreneur and for many years. In 2017 he started working as a football consultant and ambassador.

References

External links 

1977 births
Living people
Belgian footballers
R.W.D. Molenbeek players
Association football goalkeepers